Simon John Cobrin Keen (born 4 October 1987 in Penrith, New South Wales) is an Australian cricketer. He is currently a member of the New South Wales Blues state squad. Keen plays club cricket for The Entrance Seagulls in  Central Coast Cricket Association and has played in the Big Bash League for the Sydney Thunder in season 2012–13 and the Sydney Sixers in 2015.

Previously, Simon has been the First Grade Captain and Club Coach of the Warnervale Wildcats Cricket Club on the NSW Central Coast, before making the move across town to The Entrance Cricket Club, the home of the Gullies.

In January 2020, Keen was appointed as the head coach and high performance manager of the Vanuatu national cricket team, replacing Clint McKay. He resigned after a few months following the outbreak of the COVID-19 pandemic in Vanuatu.

See also
 List of New South Wales representative cricketers

References

1987 births
Living people
Australian cricketers
Canterbury cricketers
New South Wales cricketers
Sydney Thunder cricketers
Sydney Sixers cricketers
Cricketers from Sydney
Australian expatriate sportspeople in Vanuatu
Coaches of the Vanuatu national cricket team